Nimmer may refer to

People 
 Melville Nimmer (1923–1985), American lawyer and expert in freedom of speech and copyright law
 Dan Nimmer (born 1982), American jazz pianist and composer
 David Nimmer, professor at the UCLA School of Law and son of Melville.
 Raymond Nimmer (1944–2018), attorney and Dean of the University of Houston Law Center

Other 
 Nimmer on Copyright, a 1963 copyright treatise initially written by Melville Nimmer, now revised by David Nimmer